Robert Waldman (born 1936)  is an American composer, musical arranger, and orchestrator.
Waldman has collaborated with Alfred Uhry twice, on Here's Where I Belong, the disastrous 1968 adaptation of John Steinbeck's East of Eden that closed on opening night, and the considerably more successful The Robber Bridegroom, which was produced on Broadway in both 1975 and 1976, enjoyed a year-long US national tour, and has become a staple of regional theatres. It garnered Waldman a Drama Desk Award nomination for Outstanding Music.

Over the years he has composed, arranged, and orchestrated incidental music for the Broadway stagings of numerous dramatic plays, including The Rivals, Dinner at Eight, Ivanov, The Last Night of Ballyhoo, The School for Scandal, The Heiress, and Abe Lincoln in Illinois.

References

External links

American male composers
American musical theatre composers
Living people
1936 births